Chakhmaqlui may refer to:
 Chakhmaqlui-ye Sofla